Eurydice was a French submarine, one of eleven of the .

French and Italian search teams found an oil slick and a few bits of debris, including a part that bore the name Eurydice.

The cause of the explosion was never determined. All 57 crew were lost.

See also
List of submarines of France

References

External links

Daphné-class submarines of the French Navy
Ships built in France
1962 ships
Maritime incidents in 1970
Lost submarines of France
Shipwrecks in the Mediterranean Sea
Ships lost with all hands